Copris howdeni, or Howden's copri, is a species of dung beetle in the family Scarabaeidae.

References

Further reading

External links

 

Coprini
Beetles described in 1959